KCNE1-like also known as KCNE1L is a protein that in humans is encoded by the KCNE1L gene.

Function 
Voltage-gated potassium (Kv) channels represent the most complex class of voltage-gated ion channels from both functional and structural standpoints. Their diverse functions include regulating neurotransmitter release, heart rate, insulin secretion, neuronal excitability, epithelial electrolyte transport, smooth muscle contraction, and cell volume. KCNE5 encodes a membrane protein, KCNE5 (originally named KCNE1-L) that has sequence similarity to the KCNE1 gene product, a member of the potassium channel, voltage-gated, isk-related subfamily.

The KCNE gene family comprises five genes in the human genome, each encoding a type I membrane protein. The KCNE subunits are potassium channel regulatory subunits that do not pass currents themselves but alter the properties of potassium channel pore-forming alpha subunits. KCNE5 is thus far the least-studied member of the KCNE family, but it is known to regulate a number of different Kv channel subtypes. KCNE5 co-assembles with KCNQ1, a Kv alpha subunit best known for its role in ventricular repolarization and in multiple epithelia. This co-assembly induces a +140 mV shift in voltage dependence of activation (when co-expressed in CHO cells) which would inhibit KCNQ1 activity across the normal physiological voltage range in most tissues.

KCNE5 also inhibits activity of channels formed with KCNQ1 and KCNE1. While reportedly not affecting KCNQ2, KCNQ2/3 or KCNQ5 channel activity, KCNE5 inhibits KCNQ4 in CHO cells but not in oocytes.

Although it has no known effects on hERG (Kv11.1) or Kv1.x family channel activity, KCNE5 inhibits Kv2.1 activity 50% and accelerates activation, slows deactivation and accelerates the recovery from closed state inactivation of channels formed by Kv2.1 and the 'silent' alpha subunit, Kv6.4.

KCNE5 was previously reported to not regulate Kv4.2 or Kv4.3, but has been found to accelerate, and left-shift the voltage dependence of, inactivation of Kv4.3-KChIP2 channel complexes.

Structure
The KCNE family subunits are type I membrane proteins with an extracellular N-terminus and intracellular C-terminus. The transmembrane domain is alpha helical in KCNE1, 2 and 3 and predicted to also be helical in KCNE4 and KCNE5. The acknowledged role of members of the KCNE family is as Kv channel beta subunits, regulating the functional properties of Kv alpha subunits, with all three segments of the beta subunit contributing to binding, functional modulation and/or trafficking modulation to a greater or lesser degree. The high resolution structure of KCNE5 has not yet been determined, as of 2016. KCNE5 is an X-linked gene encoding a 143 residue protein in Homo sapiens.

Tissue distribution
Human KCNE5 transcripts are most highly expressed in cardiac and skeletal muscle, spinal cord and brain, and it is also detectable in placenta. In mice, Kcne5 transcript was detected in embryonic cranial nerve migrating crest cells, ganglia, somites and myoepicaridal layer.

Clinical significance
This intronless gene is deleted in AMME contiguous gene syndrome and is potentially involved in the cardiac and neurologic abnormalities found in the AMME contiguous gene syndrome.

KCNE5 is expressed in the human placenta and its expression increases in preeclampsia, although causality has not been established for this phenomenon.

Inherited sequence variants in human KCNE5 are associated with atrial fibrillation and Brugada syndrome. Atrial fibrillation is the most common chronic cardiac arrhythmia, affecting 2-3 million in the United States alone, predominantly in the aging population. A minority of cases are linked to ion channel gene mutations, whereas the majority are associated with structural heart defects.  Brugada syndrome is a relatively rare but lethal ventricular arrhythmia most commonly linked to voltage-gated sodium channel gene SCN5A mutations, but also associated with some Kv channel gene sequence variants.

KCNE5 mutation L65F is associated with atrial fibrillation and upregulates KCNQ1-KCNE1 currents when co-expressed with these subunits. In contrast, a polymorphism in KCNE5 encoding a P33S substitution was found to be less common in atrial fibrillation patients than in control subjects, although these findings were at odds with those of other studies.

KCNE5-Y81H was detected in a man with a type 1 Brugada pattern body-surface electrocardiogram, while KCNE5-D92E:E93X was detected in another case of Brugada and associated with premature sudden death in other male family members, but not females - significant because KCNE5 is an X-linked gene. These two gene variants did not affect KCNQ1-KCNE1 currents when co-expressed in CHO cells, but produced larger currents than wild-type KCNE5 when coexpressed with Kv4.3-KChIP2, giving a possible mechanism for Brugada syndrome, i.e., increased ventricular Ito density.

A KCNE5 non-coding region gene variant, the G variant of the rs697829 A/G polymorphism, has also been reported to associate with prolonged QT interval and higher hazard ratio for death, compared to the G variant.

Notes

References

Further reading 

 
 
 
 
 
 
 

Ion channels